Alice Schwartz (born 1925/1926) is an American billionaire businesswoman.

According to Forbes, Schwartz has an estimated net worth of US$2.4 billion as of July 2022.

Biography 
Schwartz graduated from the University of California, Berkeley with a degree in biochemistry. While at Berkeley, she met fellow student David Schwartz, whom she married, and in 1952, the couple founded the life sciences research company Bio-Rad Laboratories with their joint savings of $720. Schwartz was a researcher and director with the company, and has served on its board since its founding. After her husband died in 2012, Schwartz's son Norman became the company's chairman and CEO.

, Schwartz is worth an estimated $2.5 billion, ranking her No.378 in the Forbes 400 list of The Richest People in America.

According to Forbes, she is also the oldest, richest woman in the United States.

References

Living people
1920s births
People from El Cerrito, California
University of California, Berkeley alumni
American company founders
American women company founders
American billionaires
Female billionaires
21st-century American women